Barney McAll (born Melbourne, Australia, 1966) is a jazz pianist and composer who lives in Melbourne, Australia. McAll joined Gary Bartz's band in 1997, and has also played with the Josh Roseman Unit, Fred Wesley and the JB's, Groove Collective, and Kurt Rosenwinkel's "Heartcore". He completed his Bachelor of Music at the Victorian College of the Arts in Melbourne, and studied in New York and Cuba. Barney is the brother of pianist John McAll.

His ensembles include M.O.D.A.S, GRAFT, ASIO (Australian Symbiotic Improvisers Orbit), and Non-Compliance. His most recent ensemble is Precious Energy, which features members from Hiatus Kaiyote, Laneous, and Rita Satch. He released a political Black Mirror pop album in 2018 called Global Intimacy under the pseudonym TQX which features Sia, Kool A.D., Cormega, Daniel Merriweather & Sirah

He was awarded the Australia Council Fellowship in 2007 and worked as musical director for Australian vocalist Sia from 2011 to 2012.

McAll is the 2015 recipient of the Peggy Glanville-Hicks composer residency in Sydney, Australia and has curated the APRA AMCOS Art Music Awards from 2019 to 2022.

He has played in over 100 albums as a sideman and has recorded or toured internationally with musicians such as Dewey Redman, Roy Ayers, Maceo Parker, Jimmy Cobb, Eddie Henderson, Aloe Blacc, Bernie Worrell, Peter Apfelbaum, Billy Harper, Daniel Merriweather and Vernel Fournier. At the ARIA Music Awards of 2015 McAll won Best Jazz Album for Mooroolbark.

Discography

Albums

Albums As A Sideman
1993 – Vince Jones – It All Ends Up In Tears
1993 – Bill Ware – Groove Thing (Eight Ball)
1994 – Kate Ceberano and Friends – ABC
1996 – Vince Jones – Trustworthy Little Sweethearts
1996 – Dale Barlow – Dale Barlow
1997 – Vince Jones – Future Girl
1997 – Tim Rollinson – Cause + Effect Mercury Records
1997 – Jack Lee – Poong-Un – Nuevo
1998 – Vince Jones – Here’s to the Miracles
1998 – Slave Pianos – A Diagnosis Revolver Records
1999 – David Rex – Collision Course
1999 – Vince Jones – Virtue
1999 – The Whitlams – Love This City
1999 – Groove Collective – Declassified (Shanachie)
1999 – Gary Bartz – Live At The Jazz Standard
2000 – Phil Stack – Lucky You
2000 – LIVE and Hard to Find Groove Collective
2000 – Richard Worth – Rise (Giant Step)
2000 – DET Live! Vol. 2: Exclusive Live Performances from WDET-FM 101.9 Detroit
2001 – Vincent Herring – Save The World
2001 – Ron Trent
2001 – Groove Collective – Giant Step Record Sessions Vol.1 (Shanachie)
2001 – Groove Collective– It’s All in Your Mind (Shanachie)
2002 – Groove Collective – Live And Hard To Find (live album) (Kufala Records)
2002 – Gary Bartz – Live At The Jazz Standard Vol 2
2002 – Ron Trent – Musical Reflections
2002 – Wangaratta Live – Jazzhead
2002 – Groove Collective – Brooklyn, NY 04.20.02 (live album) (Kufala Records)
2003 – Red Lotus – Make Way
2003 – Greg Gonzales – X=X
2003 – Jacam Manricks – Skies the Limit
2003 – Greta Gertler – The Baby That Brought Bad Weather
2004 – Jay Rodriguez and Ron Trent Olájopé – Batidos
2004 – DJ Jazzy Jeff – In The House
2004 – Fred Wesley and The JB’s – Wuda Cuda Shuda
2004 – Paul Williamson’s Hammond Combo – A Month Of Mondays
2005 – The Modern Congress – The Hidden Soul of Harmony (Casa Del Discos)
2005 – Fabio Morgera – The Voice Within
2005 – The Jay Collins Band – Poem For You Today
2006 – Jazzhead2006 – Jazzhead records compilation
2006 – Josh Roseman – ‘Treats for the Night Walker
2006 – Groove Collective – People People Music Music Savoy Records
2006 – Greta Gertler – Pecadillo vocal feature “i’m not a lizard”
2006 – Ayla Napa Valley – Finest Ambient Tunes
2008 – Jazzhead – Jazzhead Vol 7.
2008 – Pamela Luss – Magnet
2007 – Groove Collective – PS1 Warm Up:Brooklyn, NY, July 2, 2005 (live album) (Kufala)
2007 – Umberto Echo – Dub Trail
2007 – Jojo Kuo – No Kelen Kelen – Goin Native Records
2008 – Josh Roseman – Constellations: live in Vienna (ENJA)
2008 – Jo Lawry – I Want To be Happy
2009 – Jonathan Zwartz – The Sea
2009 – Julien Wilson / Steve Magnusson – Kaleidoscopic (Jazzhead)
2009 – Sa-Ra – Nuclear Evolution: The Age of Love
2010 – Umberto Echo – Dub the World
2010 – Rebecca Barnard – Everlasting
2010 – Blue Six – Noesis
2010 – Tom Browne – S’Up (Pony Canyon)
2010 – Sia – iTunes – Live in Sydney
2011 – Andy Bey – Companions Of The Lost Ark – ILM Recordings
2012 – Jazzhead12 – Jazzhead Records
2012 – Gary Bartz – Coltrane Rules: Tao of a Music Warrior (OYO Records)
2012 – Tim Rollinson – The Protagonist (The Modern Congress)
2012 – Brad Jones – Avant Lounge (Ropeadope Records)
2012 – Tim Clarkson – Evolution Of Beauty – Dangerous Music Records
2012 – The Universal Thump – The Universal Thump
2013 – Jonathan Zwartz – The Remembering and Forgetting Of The Air
2013 – Julien Wilson – This Is Always ( Lionshare Records)
2014 – Gary Bartz – Coltrane Rules: Tao of a Music Warrior Volume 2 (OYO Records)
2014 – Sparkler – Peter Apfelbaum – I Colored It In For You EP M.O.D. Technologies Bill Laswell
2014 – Aaron Comess – Aaron Comess Quintet
2015 – Julien Wilson – This Narrow Isthmus ( Lionshare Records)
2016 – Alice Bierhorst – The Beacon
2016 – Umberto Echo – Elevator Dubs
2016 – Jazztrack – Celebrating 40 Years – ABC
2017 – Sara Valenzuela – Fulgor
2018 – John Wesley Harding – Greatest Other Peoples Hits
2018 – Mike Rivett Quartet – Live At Cottage Point
2018 – Jonathan Zwartz – Animarum
2019 – Kian – Bliss – EMI Music
2019 – Laneous – Monstera Deliciosa- Soul Has No Tempo
2019 – Michael Jordan – AIM
2019 – How Much Is the Robot – Analog Bass Camp
2019 – The Art Of Fighting – Luna Low
2020 – Daniel Merriweather – “Rain” – (Rain Recordings)
2020 – Jazz 100 selected Highlights – ABC
2020 – Third Wing (with Rob Vincs)
2020 – MIJF – These Digital Times Compilation
2021 – Martha Marlow – Dont Want To Grow Up
2021 – Gian Slater – Grey Is Ground
2021 – Dewey Redman – Live In Chicago (Extracelestial Arts)
2021 – Billy Harper Quartet – Live In Brooklyn (Extracelestial Arts)

Collaborator
1998 – Jonathan Zwartz, Hamish Stuart, Barney McAll – Zeeks Beek ABC/EMI
2005 – Jody Watley, Ron Trent, Barney McAll – Saturday Night Experience
2005 – Barney McAll, Genji Siraisi – Baby Winter
2006 – Barney McAll, Badal Roy, Rufus Cappadocia – Vivid
2008 – George Schuller, Barney McAll, Matt Pavolka – That Trio This
2009 – Sylent Running – Empathy Chip
2014 – Trio Feral – Don’t Feed
2020 – Seven Wonders Compilation – Wondercore Island/Plug Seven
2020 – WatArtists Compilation – At Clouds Length
2020 – Third Wing (with Rob Vincs)
2021 – Sex On Toast – Take Your Mask Off
2022 - King Gizzard And The Lizzard Wizzard - Ominum Gatherum

Arranger
1996 – Vince Jones – Trustworthy Little Sweethearts
1997 – Vince jones – Future Girl
1998 – Vince Jones – Here’s to the Miracles
1999 – Vince Jones – Virtue
2000 – Vince Jones – Live
2006 – Pamela Luss – There’s Something About You I Don’t Know
2007 – Pamela Luss – Your Eyes
2008 – Pamela Luss – Magnet
2008 – Paulette McWilliams – Flow
2010 – Tom Scott with Paulette McWilliams – Telling Stories
2010 – Rebecca Barnard – Everlasting

Producer
1997 – Vince Jones – Future Girl
1998 – Vince Jones – Here’s to the Miracles
2006 – Barney McAll, Badal Roy, Rufus Cappadocia – Vivid
2009 – Jacam Manricks – Labyrinths (Co-Producer)
2009 – Sylent Running – Empathy Chip
2010 – Rebecca Barnard – Everlasting (Co-Producer)
2012 – Brad Jones – Avant Lounge (Ropeadope Records) (Co-Producer)
2018 – Global Intimacy – TQX (Extra Celestial Arts)
2019 – Michael Jordan – AIM (Co-Producer)
2019 – An Extra Celestial Christmas –(Extra Celestial Arts)
2020 – Daniel Merriweather – “Rain” – (Rain Recordings) (Co-Producer)
2021 – Gian Slater – Grey Is Ground
2021 – Sex On Toast – Take Your Mask Off (Co-Producer, Co-Composer)
2022 – Precious Energy – (Extra Celestial Arts)

Solo Albums Producer
1996 – Exit (Jazzhead)
2000 – Release the Day (Transparent Music/Jazzhead)
2005 – Mother of Dreams and Secrets (Jazzhead)
2009 – Flashbacks (Extracelestial Arts)
2011 – Blueprints (Jazzhead)
2011 – Recollections – Best Of (Jazzhead)
2012 – Graft (Jazzhead)
2013 – Swirl Cauldron Swirl (Extra Celestial Arts)
2013 – Solo Piano Live (Extra Celestial Arts)
2015 – Mooroolbark (ABC Jazz)
2017 – Hearing The Blood (Extra Celestial Arts)
2018 – Zephyrix with Monash Art Ensemble (Extra Celestial Arts)
2018 – Global Intimacy – TQX (Extra Celestial Arts)
2022 – Precious Energy – (Extra Celestial Arts)

Film Score Credits
The Forgotten Australians – SBS Broadcasting Group
Pushing The Elephant – PBS
The Position – Second Act Films
We All Fall Down – The American Mortgage Crisis
Overhere – Documentary – Reelworks/ Chanel Thirteen
Bayshore – A Small Piece of The World
Water Flowing Together – Gwendolen Cates/ PBS
I Am Ahmed Ahmed
Motherland Afghanistan – Aubin Pictures/ Independent Lens
Hide and Seek – 20th Century Fox
Kathy Griffin – Kathy Griffin: My Life on the D-List
Face Value
Sacco and Vanzetti – Documentary by Peter Miller/ Ken Burns Florentine Films
Peter Berner’s Loaded Brush – Australian Broadcasting Corporation
Liberia: An Uncivil War – Discovery/Times
Brother to Brother – Rodney Evans- Independent Lens
Freaks Like Me – Giraffe Partners
Solstice
Homecoming- Edwina Throsby
Otto and Lumilla – John C Williams
Necesidades- Fernando de France
Facing The Dragon- Sedika Mojadidi
Gertie’s Law – Supreme Court Podcast

Compositional Works 
1993 “Diminuet” Exploring the possibilities of the miniature (La Mama, Carlton, VIC)
1999 ¡¡EMANCIPATE THE DISSONANCE!! with Slave Pianos (Lombard-Freid Fine Arts NYC)
2004 Two lives in flux – and vice versa Vilnius, Lithuania
2009 “Vanishing Point” collaboration with video artist Janet Biggs (Claire Oliver Gallery NYC)
2015 “The Unanswered Question (once touched, remains unknown) ” The University of Houston Choral Chorale Choir with Janet Biggs
2016 Zephyrix – Monash Art Ensemble
2016 Transitive Cycles – Federation Bells Commission, City Of Melbourne
2017 “Attrocity Slave” – Slave Pianos – Moscow Stations / Last Stop East – Part II – Continent of Sorrow
2018 “Trilogy Of Cycles” – Federation Bells Commission, City Of Melbourne
1999 ¡¡EMANCIPATE THE DISSONANCE!! with Slave Pianos (Lombard-Freid Fine Arts NYC)
2004 Two lives in flux – and vice versa Vilnius, Lithuania
2009 “Vanishing Point” collaboration with video artist Janet Biggs (Claire Oliver Gallery NYC)
2015 “The Unanswered Question” for UH Chorale Choir with Janet Biggs
2015 ZEPHYRIX for Monash Art Ensemble

Awards and nominations

AIR Awards
The Australian Independent Record Awards (commonly known informally as AIR Awards) is an annual awards night to recognize, promote and celebrate the success of Australia's Independent Music sector.

|-
|AIR Awards of 2012
|Graft 
|Best Independent Jazz Album
|
|-
|AIR Awards of 2015
|Mooroolbark 
|Best Independent Jazz Album
|
|-

APRA Awards
The APRA Awards are held in Australia and New Zealand by the Australasian Performing Right Association to recognise songwriting skills, sales and airplay performance by its members annually. 

|-
! scope="row" rowspan="2"| 1993
| rowspan="2"| "Hindered On His Way to Heaven" (with Vince Jones)
| Best Jazz Composition
| 
|-

ARIA Music Awards
The ARIA Music Awards is an annual awards ceremony that recognises excellence, innovation, and achievement across all genres of Australian music. They commenced in 1987. 

! 
|-
| 1996
| Exit
| Best Jazz Album
| 
|rowspan="5"| 
|-
| 2012
| Graft
| Best Jazz Album
| 
|-
| 2015
| Mooroolbark
| Best Jazz Album
| 
|-
| 2018
| Hearing the Blood
| Best Jazz Album
| 
|-
| 2019
| Zephyrix
| Best Jazz Album
| 
|-
| 2022
| Precious Energy
| Best Jazz Album
| 
| 
|-

Art Music Awards
The Art Music Awards are presented each year by the Australasian Performing Right Association (APRA) and the Australian Music Centre (AMC) to recognise achievement in the composition, performance, education and presentation of Australian music. Art music covers activity across contemporary classical music, contemporary jazz and improvised music, experimental music and sound art.

|-
| 2018
| Hearing The Blood
|Excellence In Jazz
| 
|-

Australian Jazz Bell Awards
The Australian Jazz Bell Awards (also known as the Bell Awards or The Bells), are annual music awards for the jazz music genre in Australia. 

! 
|-
| 2006
| Mother of Dreams And Secrets
| Best Jazz Album
| 
|
|-
| 2010
| "Flashback"
| Best Jazz Song
| 
|
|-
| 2010
| Flashbacks
| Best Contemporary Jazz Album
| 
|
|-
| 2012
| "Nostalgia for the Present"
| Best Jazz Song
| 
|
|-
| 2012
| Graft
| Best Contemporary Jazz Album
| 

|-
| 2014
| TRIO FERAL: DONT FEED
| Best Contemporary Jazz Album
| 
|
|-
| 2016
| "ASIO"
| Best Ensemble
| 
|
|-
| 2016
| Mooroolbark
| Best Jazz Album
| 
|
|-
| 2016
| "Nectar Spur"
| Best Jazz Song
| 
|
|-
| 2017
| ASIO
| Best Ensemble 
| 
|
|-
| 2017
| Hearing the Blood
| Best Album
| 
|
|-
| 2017
| Hearing the Blood
| Best Produced Album
| 
|
|-
| 2017
| "Love Is The Blood"
| Best Jazz Song
| 
|
|-
| 2019
| Zephyrix
| Best Instrumental Jazz Album
| 
|
|-
| 2019
| Zephyrix
| Best Produced Album
| 
|
|-
|}

Australian Music Prize

|-
| 2018
| Zephyrix
| Best Album
| 
|-
|-
| 2022
| Precious Energy
| Best Album
| 
|-

Grammy Awards
The Grammy Award (stylized as GRAMMY, originally called Gramophone Award), or just Grammy, is an award presented by the Recording Academy to recognize "Outstanding Achievement in the music industry" of the United States. 

|-
|2007
|People People, Music Music 
|Best Independent Jazz Album (With Groove Collective)
|
|-

Music Victoria Awards
The Music Victoria Awards are an annual awards night celebrating Victorian music. They commenced in 2006.

! 
|-
| 2015
| Mooroolbark
| Best Jazz Album
| 
|rowspan="2"| 
|-
| 2018
| Hearing The Blood
| Best Jazz Album
| 
|-
| 2022
| Barney McAll
| Best Jazz Work
| 
| 
|-

Other Awards
1990 Winner Jazz Piano Award at the Wangaratta Festival Of Jazz
1998 Best Jazz Composition Award from NSW Jazz Action society
2007-2008 Australia Council Fellowship
2015 Peggy Glanville-Hicks Composer Residency

References

External links
 Barney Mcall
 Barney McAll at Jazzhead.com
 Sacco and Vanzetti Documentary Film Site
 Motherland Afghanistan Documentary Film Site
 Liberia: an uncivil war Documentary Film Site
 Water Flowing Together

Living people
1966 births
ARIA Award winners
American jazz composers
American male jazz composers
American jazz pianists
American male pianists
20th-century American pianists
21st-century American pianists
20th-century American male musicians
21st-century American male musicians
Groove Collective members
Australian jazz pianists
Australian jazz composers
Australian emigrants to the United States
Musicians from Melbourne